The 1906 Goldey College football team represented Goldey College (now known as Goldey–Beacom College) in the 1906 college football season as an independent.

Schedule

References

Goldey College
Goldey College football seasons
Goldey College football
College football winless seasons